The Philippine Senate Committee on Sustainable Development Goals, Innovation and Futures Thinking is a standing committee of the Senate of the Philippines.

This committee was created during the 18th Congress on September 3, 2019, through Senate Resolution No. 9.

Jurisdiction 
According to the Rules of the Senate, the committee handles all matters relating to the United Nations 2030 Agenda for Sustainable Development and the assessment of the country's performance in attaining these development goals.

Members, 18th Congress 
Based on the Rules of the Senate, the Senate Committee on Sustainable Development Goals, Innovation and Futures Thinking has 15 members.

The President Pro Tempore, the Majority Floor Leader, and the Minority Floor Leader are ex officio members.

Here are the members of the committee in the 18th Congress as of September 24, 2020:

Committee secretary: Ma. Lourdes A. Juan-Alzate / Eduardo C. Garvida

See also 

 List of Philippine Senate committees

References 

Sustainable
Sustainable Development Goals